Eupithecia litoris is a moth in the family Geometridae first described by James Halliday McDunnough in 1946. It is found in the US state of California.

Adults are light grayish or cream in color.

References

Moths described in 1946
litoris
Moths of North America